Mariana Ohata (born October 26, 1978) is an athlete from Brazil, who competes in triathlon.

A former member of the Brazilian National Swim Team, Ohata competed at the first Olympic triathlon at the 2000 Summer Olympics.  She was one of two Brazilian athletes, along with Carla Moreno, to not finish the competition.

She competed again at the 2004 Summer Olympics four years later.  This time, she finished with a time of 2:16:52.97 in thirty-seventh place.

Doping bans
In 2002, Ohata was banned from competition for 60 weeks by the Brazilian Triathlon Confederation. In June 2009, Ohata tested positive for furosemide, a result confirmed by the "B" sample. In October 2009, Ohata was banned from competition for six years, the minimum penalty for a second doping offence under ITU rules. As a result of the ban, she was unable to compete in her "home" Olympics in Rio de Janeiro.

References

External links
 Profile

1978 births
Living people
Doping cases in triathlon
Brazilian female triathletes
Brazilian people of Japanese descent
Sportspeople from Brasília
Olympic triathletes of Brazil
Triathletes at the 1999 Pan American Games
Triathletes at the 2000 Summer Olympics
Triathletes at the 2003 Pan American Games
Triathletes at the 2004 Summer Olympics
Triathletes at the 2007 Pan American Games
Triathletes at the 2008 Summer Olympics
Brazilian sportspeople in doping cases
Pan American Games competitors for Brazil
20th-century Brazilian women
21st-century Brazilian women